The Last Duel also known as Dark Skinned Assassin and Hero vs Hero, is a 1981 Taiwanese film adapted from Youling Shanzhuang of Gu Long's Lu Xiaofeng novel series.

Cast
Barry Chan as Lu Xiaofeng
Ling Yun as Ximen Chuixue
Nora Miao
Hsu Feng
Chan Wai-lau
Tin Yau
Cheung Pang

References

External links

1981 films
Taiwanese martial arts films
Wuxia films
Works based on Lu Xiaofeng (novel series)
Films based on works by Gu Long